Sandia Preparatory School is an independent college preparatory school located in Albuquerque, New Mexico serving students in sixth through twelfth grade. The school is accredited by the Independent Schools Association of the Southwest (ISAS) and the New Mexico Public Education Department, and is a founding member of the Independent Curriculum Group and a member of the National Association of Independent Schools (NAIS).

Mission Statement & Vision 
Mission Statement: “The joy of learning and living is at the center of all we do. Sandia Preparatory School provides remarkable opportunities for intellectual and personal growth within a challenging and balanced program. As an extension of our families, Sandia Prep’s diverse community inspires students to find their academic focus, talents, and creativity.”

Vision: “At Sandia Prep, we will inspire our students to discover their purposes in the world by: developing essential skills and intellectual potential through challenging academics; cultivating a socially responsible environment of innovation and creativity; and engaging as a vibrant community for the betterment of society.”

History 
In 1958, Barbara Young Simms began to investigate the possibility of starting a girls day school in Albuquerque. In 1965, she secured land, established a board of trustees, and formed the Sandía School, a nonsectarian school. In late January 1966, the Rev. Paul G. Saunders, an Episcopal priest, was selected headmaster and, later that year, the school opened. The year began with 75 students in grades 5 through 10 (grade 11 was added the next year; grade 12 the year after), and finished with 82 students.

In 1969, Orell Phillips served as interim headmaster while the school’s board searched for a new head. In 1970, Mose Hale became third headmaster. Three years later, Sandía School became coeducational. In 1974, Elton Knutson was selected as fourth headmaster.

The school began to refer to itself as Sandia Preparatory School and expanded to a coeducational school during the 1974-75 academic year. Fifth-grade classes were discontinued in the 1985-86 school year. For the next academic year, Dick Heath joined Sandia Prep as its fifth headmaster.

Since its founding in 1966, Sandia Prep has grown from a girls school serving 82 students in three buildings to a coeducational institution serving 670 students at its maximum in multiple buildings and facilities that fill a 30-acre (120,000 m2) campus. The first graduating class in 1969 consisted of six girls and has risen to roughly 80.

Sandia Prep is “descended” from the original Sandía School, a private day and boarding school for girls founded by Ruth Hanna McCormick (Barbara Young Simms’s aunt by marriage) in 1932. In its first year, Sandía School held classes for five students and one teacher in a private house where Manzano Day School is now located. The school was formed in part to help prepare girls for further study or college in the Eastern United States.

In 1937, the school moved to a new permanent campus (now part of Kirtland Air Force Base). Mrs. Simms commissioned architect John Gaw Meem to design the school complex in the territorial style. By 1938, the school had 75 students, nine of whom were boarders, and 18 faculty. In 1942, due to World War II, Sandía School closed. A number of alumnae from the first Sandía School actively participated in the organization of the current Sandia Prep School.

In the fall of 2021, the School’s Board of Trustees unanimously voted Heather B. Mock to succeed retiring Head of School Bill Sinfield. Sinfield had a well-regarded seven-year tenure at Prep. He was known for improving the School’s budgetary and fundraising prowess and for greeting students at the front of school with a handshake every morning. He also led the School’s administrative leadership team through the COVID-19 pandemic, offering off-campus and hybrid teaching as ably as possible as Prep faced monthly changes in the rules for social contact per the state department of health guidelines.

In the 2022-2023 school year, Mock returned to Prep, where she first began her academic career nearly 30 years earlier, as its tenth head of school.

Heads of School 
Rev. Paul G. Saunders, Headmaster 1966-1969

Orell A. Phillips, Acting Headmaster 1969-1970

Mose V. Hale, Headmaster 1970-1974

Elton H. Knutson, Headmaster 1974-1986

Dick Heath, Headmaster 1986-2010

Ron Briley, Acting Headmaster 2004-2005

Steve Albert, Head of School 2010-2014

Joyce Whelchel, Interim Head of School 2014-2015

Bill Sinfield, Head of School 2015-2022

Heather B. Mock, Head of School, 2022-

Curriculum

Sandia Prep is an independent school and does not accept funding from the district, state, or federal government; therefore, it is not restricted by policies put in place by those entities. The school has developed a more rigorous college-prep curriculum as compared to a state-prescribed one.  The curriculum is typified by a focus on experiential learning, critical thinking, and collaboration. Every department offers advanced classes to help position students well for college admission. 

Prep’s sixth and seventh grades are arranged with an elective rotation cycle which allows students to sample many courses in their first two years to begin to know their own talents and interests; classes rotate every quarter. The upper school (high school grades nine through twelve) is designed to provide students with the opportunity to test their skills in a variety of academic disciplines. English, mathematics, science, history, modern language, arts, digital media and communications, and physical education are all required. Independent study and special, depth-diving academic programs are also offered.

Prep is known for the rapport which forms between its faculty and students. Its diverse teaching staff encourages engagement, global awareness, and experimentation. 

The school has a rotating schedule of four days lettered A-D. There are eight periods, four of which are featured in a school day. Middle school and upper school assemblies, office hours, and class advisories are included throughout the week.

Facilities
Sandia Prep encompasses 33 acres, including 5 sports fields, 4 newly-renovated tennis courts, and a contemporary track and soccer stadium. There are 16 campus buildings totaling 171,496 square feet. The buildings include over 50 classrooms and administrative offices, three computer labs, the DesignLab (Prep's makerspace), art studios, a photo lab, the Center for Learning Excellence, the Outdoor Leadership Program, Saunders Library, the Russell Student Center and its cafeteria, the Pitchfork Café, a dance room, a rehearsal room, and the 300+ seat McCall Family Theater which was renovated in the fall of 2018.

Prep completed a million-dollar renovation of its track and soccer stadium in 2015 and rebuilt its tennis courts in 2021. The school has an additional soccer field, and baseball and softball fields. The campus includes two gyms: the West Gym which seats 600 people and can be configured for four basketball courts or four volleyball courts; and the Field House, built in 2008, which includes the 850-seat gymnasium, a weight room, multipurpose room, locker rooms, offices, and spacious lobby.

Sandia Prep is the only high school in New Mexico that has its own observatory.

Athletics 
More than 78% of Prep students play on 54 teams in 22 sports offered. All students from sixth through eighth grade take PE classes as part of their regular schedule. 

Beginning in sixth grade, students may participate in:

 Basketball
 Cross Country
 Dance
 Flag Football
 Golf
 Mountain Biking
 Soccer
 Softball
 Tennis
 Track and Field
 Volleyball

Beginning in eighth grade, students may participate in all sports offered to sixth- and seventh-grade students, as well as:

 Baseball
 Bowling
 eSports
 Lacrosse
 Swim

All eighth-grade Sandia Prep students are eligible to participate in upper school athletics, at any level of competition (freshman, c-team, junior varsity, or variety) provided they receive approval from the Sandia Prep Athletic Director and the New Mexico Activities Association.

New Mexico State Championships

 Baseball: 2001, 2005, 2009, 2011, 2015, 2016, 2021
 Boys Soccer: 1985, 1987, 1988, 1989, 1990, 1992, 1993, 2001, 2002, 2003, 2004, 2005, 2006, 2010, 2011, 2012, 2013, 2018, 2020, 2021
 Girls Soccer: 2002, 2004, 2006, 2011, 2012, 2016, 2017, 2018, 2019, 2021
 Volleyball: 2004, 2015, 2016, 2017, 2020
 Boys Team Tennis: 2009, 2010
 Boys Doubles Tennis: 2004,
 Boys Singles Tennis: 2008, 2010, 2013
 Girls Team Tennis: 2002, 2005, 2009
 Girls Doubles Tennis: 2009
 Girls Singles Tennis: 2002, 2003, 2004, 2005, 2009, 2022
 Girls Track and Field: 1998, 1999, 2019
 Dance: 2022

District Championships 

 Baseball: 1999, 2000, 2001, 2003, 2004, 2005, 2007, 2008, 2009, 2010, 2011, 2014, 2015, 2016, 2021, 2022
 Boys Basketball: 1993, 1994, 2004, 2005, 2008, 2019, 2020, 2021, 2022
 Girls Basketball: 1989, 1998, 2000, 2017, 2019, 2021
 Girls Cross Country: 2002, 2012, 2013
 Boys Golf: 2002, 2003, 2004, 2007, 2008, 2009, 2019, 2021
 Girls Golf: 2019, 2020, 2021
 Boys Soccer: 1984, 1988, 1989, 1990, 1992, 1993, 1997, 1998, 1999, 2000, 2001, 2002, 2003, 2004, 2005, 2006, 2007, 2008, 2009, 2011, 2012, 2013, 2014, 2017, 2018, 2020, 2021
 Girls Soccer: 1992, 1996, 1999, 2000, 2001, 2002, 2003, 2004, 2005, 2006, 2007, 2008, 2009, 2010, 2016, 2018, 2019, 2021
 Softball: 2001, 2002, 2004, 2005, 2011
 Boys Tennis: 2003, 2004, 2006, 2007, 2008, 2009, 2010, 2015, 2016
 Girls Tennis: 2001, 2002, 2004, 2005, 2009, 2017, 2022
 Boys Track and Field: 1989, 1990, 2001, 2004, 2006, 2019
 Girls Track and Field: 1989, 1990, 1991, 1993, 1994, 1995, 1996, 1997, 1998, 1999, 2000, 2001, 2002, 2004, 2009
 Volleyball: 1987, 1988, 1989, 2000, 2001, 2003, 2004, 2005, 2006, 2009, 2015, 2016, 2017, 2018, 2019, 2020

References

 www.sandiaprep.org 
 Annual Report 2020-2021  
 Curriculum Guide 2020-2023
 www.niche.com listing
 www.privateschoolreview.com listing

External links
 Sandia Preparatory School website

Independent Schools Association of the Southwest
High schools in Albuquerque, New Mexico
Preparatory schools in New Mexico
Educational institutions established in 1966
Private middle schools in New Mexico
Private high schools in New Mexico
1966 establishments in New Mexico